HMS Dreadnought was a 64-gun third rate ship of the line of the Royal Navy, launched at Blackwall Yard in 1691. She was reduced to a fourth rate in 1697.

Dreadnought was rebuilt at Blackwall in 1706 as a fourth rate of 60 guns. She was enlarged in 1722, and converted into a hulk in 1740. She continued to serve in this role until 1748, when she was broken up.

She was captained from 1716 to 1718 by Sir Tancred Robinson.

Notes

References

Lavery, Brian (2003) The Ship of the Line - Volume 1: The development of the battlefleet 1650-1850. Conway Maritime Press. .

Ships of the line of the Royal Navy
1690s ships
Ships built by the Blackwall Yard